Advanced Placement examinations (AP exams) are exams offered in United States by the College Board and are taken each May by students.  The tests are the culmination of year-long Advanced Placement (AP) courses. AP exams (with few exceptions) have a multiple-choice section and a free-response section.

AP Studio Art requires students to submit a portfolio for review. AP Computer Science Principles requires students to complete the Create task, which is part of the AP grade for the class.

History
The AP exams grew out of programs initiated in 1951. Part of the rationale for advanced placement given in 1952 was that "advanced standing at the normal college-entering age after high school graduation is more desirable, for many reasons, than acceleration of able students out of high school at age 15½ or 16...". The first Advanced Placement exams were administered in 1954 by the Educational Testing Service (ETS) to students limited to 27 schools participating at that time. In 1955, the College Board assumed leadership of the program and testing, deciding on curricula and pedagogical approaches, while retaining ETS to design and score the tests. The exams were given nationally for the first time in May 1956, and students could take whichever tests they wanted for a single $10 fee. The 2020 exams were taken as 45-minute online at-home exams due to the COVID-19 pandemic.

AP exam format
The exams themselves do not grade the students' mastery of the course material in a traditional sense. Rather, the students' results guide the grading rubrics and the scale for the "AP Grades" of each exam.

The AP exams are graded each summer at a week-long "grading camp." Both high school AP teachers and university professors are invited to grade the exams at a predetermined location. When the AP Reading is over for a particular exam, the free response scores are combined with the results of computer-scored multiple-choice questions based upon a previously announced weighting.

The Chief Reader (a college or university faculty member selected by the Educational Testing Service and The College Board) then meets with members of ETS and sets the cutoff scores for each AP Grade. The Chief Reader's decision is based upon what percentage of students earned each AP Grade over the previous three years, how students did on multiple-choice questions that are used on the test from year to year, how he or she viewed the overall quality of the answers to the free response questions, how university students who took the exam as PART A experimental studies did, and how students performed on different parts of the exam.

No one outside of ETS is allowed to find out a student's raw score on an AP Exam and the cutoff scores for a particular exam are only released to the public if that particular exam is released in total (this happens on a staggered schedule and occurs approximately once every five to seven years for each exam). Usually, a 70 to 75 percent out of 100 translates to a 5. However, there are some exams that are exceptions to this rule of thumb. The AP Grades that are reported to students, high schools, colleges, and universities in July are on AP's five-point scale:

5: Extremely well qualified
4: Very well qualified
3: Qualified
2: Possibly qualified
1: No recommendation

Spring 2020 exam format changes
On March 20, College Board announced changes to the spring 2020 exams due to the impact of COVID-19 on school closings. The exams will be 45 minutes long with an online testing version for at-home exams. Any student already registered for an exam can choose to cancel at no charge.

On April 3, 2020, College Board announced more details in regards to specific AP tests. The updates includes more information on the format and structure of the exam. College Board also put out new testing dates for the AP exams. One major change to the AP exam is that the tests will be completely open-note. Students may use any class notes or other non-human resources for the exam.
Additionally, College Board will be providing a free distance learning curriculum by livestreaming AP review lessons on YouTube.

In order to make sure that students from underprivileged backgrounds do not face disadvantages in terms of technology to take the test, College Board is further investing in technology resources, as this year's exam require the student to possess a smartphone, tablet, laptop, or computer and a reliable internet connection.

University credit

In the United States and elsewhere
Some colleges and universities in the U.S. grant credits or advanced placement based on AP test scores; those in over twenty other countries do likewise. Policies vary by institution, but institutions that award credit usually require a score of 3 or higher on any given exam for credit to be granted or course prerequisites to be waived (and according to The College Board website, some will award an "A" grade for a 5 score). Colleges may also take AP grades into account when deciding which students to accept, though this is not part of the official AP program.

One study found that 38% of top American universities cap the total amount of AP credits that students can receive credit for.  Moreover, 75% of schools would not reward credit for at least one AP subject and 9 schools did not reward credit for any AP exam.  The study concluded that not rewarding credits delayed graduation and increased costs for students.

Despite some similarities to A Levels in that students choose to specialize in certain subjects, AP testing does not follow the national education curriculum of United Kingdom, nor is it used as the exams for that curriculum. In that system, AS and A levels (or equivalents) are used in order to gain entry into universities, colleges and other higher education options. They are also often used in job applications. AP exam scores are widely recognized in the admissions process around the world, but credits are only sometimes accepted outside of Canada and the United States. As of August 2019, the College Board provided a downloadable list of universities outside the US that recognize AP for admission and academic credit, in a file which they refer to as "Global Higher Education Recognition". There were hundreds of universities in dozens of countries around the world that recognized AP exam scores in their admission process. AP credit is more limited, but not uncommon in countries that offer four-year undergraduate degrees and accept outside credit.

Calculator policies 

As of 2022, AP students are allowed to use any of the approved calculators, including some Casio, Texas Instruments, and Hewlett-Packard calculators. Also, they may bring up to 2 calculators. Not all exams allow a calculator, but those that do allow all the allowed calculators to be used.

Notes and references